The Clay County Courthouse in Clay Center, Kansas was built during 1900–01.  It was listed on the National Register of Historic Places in 1973.

It was designed by Topeka, Kansas architect J.C. Holland.

It is a two-story Romanesque Revival building upon a full basement.

References

Government buildings on the National Register of Historic Places in Kansas
Romanesque Revival architecture in Kansas
Government buildings completed in 1900
Clay County, Kansas